The 2017 Republic of Buryatia head election took place on 10 September 2017, on common election day. Acting Head Aleksey Tsydenov was elected for his first full term. It was the first direct Buryatia head election in 15 years since Leonid Potapov won his third term in June 2002.

Background
Head of Buryatia Vyacheslav Nagovitsyn (President of the Republic until 2012) was first appointed in 2007, he was re-appointed for a second term in 2012. On 7 February 2017, Nagovitsyn declined to seek a third term and announced his resignation at a press conference. Deputy Minister of Transport Alexey Tsydenov was appointed acting Head of the Republic. He also became the first ethnic Buryat to lead the republic.

The campaign was marked by lack of significant opposition to acting head Tsydenov, as his main opponent, Senator Vyacheslav Markhayev (CPRF), failed to qualify for the election. A Just Russia did not nominate a candidate, as its regional leader Irinchey Matkhanov was placed by Tsydenov into its shortlist for Federation Council.

Candidates
Only political parties can nominate candidates for head election in Buryatia, self-nomination is not possible. However, candidate is not obliged to be a member of the nominating party. Candidate for Head of Buryatia should be a Russian citizen and at least 30 years old. Each candidate in order to be registered is required to collect at least 7% of signatures of members and heads of municipalities (216-226 signatures). Also gubernatorial candidates present 3 candidacies to the Federation Council and election winner later appoints one of the presented candidates.

Registered candidates

Failed to qualify
 Vyacheslav Markhayev (CPRF), Member of Federation Council from Irkutsk Oblast
 Igor Pronkinov (Party of Pensioners), businessman, former leader of Buryat-Mongol People's Party, 1998 head candidate

Withdrew
 Yury Bazarzhapov (Party of the Parents of Future), private kindergartens' owner

Eliminated at convention
 Yury Bavykin (United Russia), Member of Ulan-Ude City Council, Director of Ulan-Ude Institute of Rail Transport
 Yevgeny Menshikov (LDPR), businessman, former leader of Civilian Power and Right Cause regional offices

Declined
 Yevgeny Buyanin (LDPR), local activist, former leader of Rodina regional office
 Mikhail Slipenchuk (Party of Growth), former Member of State Duma (2011-2016)

Opinion polls

Results

Tsydenov appointed former Head of Buryatia Vyacheslav Nagovitsyn to the Federation Council. Among other candidacies were incumbent Senator Tatyana Mantatova and former A Just Russia Member of State Duma (2013-2016) Irinchey Matkhanov.

See also
2017 Russian gubernatorial elections

References

2017 elections in Russia
2017 Russian gubernatorial elections
Politics of Buryatia